United Nations Security Council Resolution 1691, regarding the accession of Montenegro to the United Nations, was adopted without a vote on 22 June 2006. In the resolution, after examining the country's application for membership, the Council recommended to the General Assembly that it be admitted.

The country acceded to the United Nations on 28 June 2006 as "the Republic of Montenegro"; following the adoption of a new constitution in October 2007, this was amended to the short form "Montenegro".

See also
 Enlargement of the United Nations
 List of United Nations member states
 List of United Nations Security Council Resolutions 1601 to 1700 (2005–2006)
 United Nations Security Council Resolution 1326

References

External links
 
Text of the Resolution at undocs.org

 1691
 1691
 1691
2006 in Montenegro
June 2006 events